Michael A. Quealy  is a former Fine Gael politician in Ireland. He was a senator from 1987 to 1989, elected to the 18th Seanad on the Agricultural Panel, but was not re-elected in the 1989 elections.

References

20th-century births
Possibly living people
Fine Gael senators
Members of the 17th Seanad